A constitutional referendum was held in the Batavian Republic on 16 October 1805. Although a new constitution had been approved in an 1801 referendums, the French authorities put pressure on the Batavian State Council to pass a new constitution in which executive power was held by a single person, the Grand pensionary, a post initially filled by Rutger Jan Schimmelpenninck. The new constitution had 87 articles, which provided for a 19-seat Parliament with a three-year term which could pass or reject bills, but not change them. It was approved by 99.96% of voters.

Results

References

1805
1805 referendums
Constitutional referendum
Constitutional referendums
October 1805 events